Amazon Simple Notification Service (Amazon SNS) is a notification service provided as part of Amazon Web Services since 2010. It provides a low-cost infrastructure for the mass delivery of messages.

Amazon SNS acts as a single message bus that can message to a variety of devices and platforms, including Kindle Fire and Baidu. A single code interface can address all of these equally, or message formats can be tailored to the particular needs of each platform. Amazon SNS can also deliver messages by SMS to 200+ countries.

Description
Amazon SNS uses the publish/subscribe model for push delivery of messages. Recipients subscribe to one or more 'topics' within Amazon SNS. Typically, this is hidden from the user as an internal part of a mobile app. Receipt of a message may also be hidden from the user: this service is largely aimed at the internal processing of specific apps rather than as a generic email substitute. A game might receive bonus-level announcements or unlock keys for in-game purchases by this route. A ticket booking app could use it for confirmation vouchers, boarding passes or notifications of a delay to a flight.

Pricing
The first 1 million Amazon SNS requests per month are free, and $0.50 per 1 million requests thereafter will be charged as per the latest costing structure. Pricing varies according to the delivery mechanism: there is a charge to request a message ($0.50 /million) and a varying charge for how (and if) the recipient chooses to receive it. HTTP is cheapest for retrieval ($0.60 /million), email is around 30 times this ($20 /million) and SMS considerably (hundreds of times) more ($7,500 /million). Like most cloud services, initial access costs are kept low and there are no sign-up or subscription charges.

References

External links

Amazon Reimbursements
PPC Management For Amazon Ads

SNS
Text messaging
Mobile technology